Mulona manni is a moth of the subfamily Arctiinae first described by William Dewitt Field in 1952. It is found on the Bahamas.

References

Moths described in 1952
Lithosiini